Luciano Grostein Huck (born 3 September 1971) is a Brazilian TV host and entrepreneur. From 2000 to 2021, he hosted  the TV show Caldeirão do Huck, aired every Saturday on Brazilian network TV Globo, and also broadcast to 114 countries, via Globo International. In september 2021, Huck left his saturday show to host Domingão com Huck (former Domingão do Faustão) on Sundays.

Huck is also the founder of Joá Investments, an investment fund focused on technology and lifestyle start-up companies, that only makes partnerships with companies committed with sustainability and with the preservation of the environment. Among Joá's investments, there are Cataratas, that focus on sustainable tourism, Tembici, a bike-sharing and bike-parking system, and also Agrade Investments that works with start-ups in the USA.

Early life 
Huck was born in São Paulo, the son of the lawyer Hermes Marcelo Huck and the urban planner Marta Dora Grostein, and half-brother of the film director Fernando Grostein Andrade. Huck is Jewish, being his maternal grandfather, Mauricio Grostein, native of the city of Ekaterinoslav, Soviet Union (currently Dnipro, Ukraine). He studied at the Law School of the University of São Paulo (USP).

He was an intern at Brazilian advertising agencies such as W/Brasil. At the same time, he opened Cabral, a nightclub in São Paulo.

His first direct connection with communication was as a writer at Jornal da Tarde newspaper in 1993. His job was to write a daily section called Circulando (Circulating), about youth behavior and entertainment. Huck also started working on a radio show aired by Rádio Jovem Pan.

Huck had his television debut in 1994 with a feature on TV show "Perfil" (Profile), presented by Otávio Mesquita. He was 24 when his newspaper page Circulando became a TV show under the same name, aired on network CNT Gazeta.

Career

Television 
In September 1996, Huck made his solo debut with Programa H on Rede Bandeirantes. Luciano Huck was also the host of radio show Torpedo on Rádio Jovem Pan. At 27, Huck left the newspaper to work full-time on Programa H. Luciano Huck joined Globo network in September 1999, to host Caldeirão do Huck. His program combines entertainment and charity work. On April 8, 2018, Caldeirão do Huck celebrated its eighteenth year on air.

In June 2021, it was announced that Huck would move to Sundays in September 2021, with a new show replacing the long-running Domingão do Faustão after Fausto Silva's departure from the network. Domingão com Huck premiered on September 5, 2021.

Social entrepreneurship and politics 
Luciano Huck is the founder and chairman of Instituto Criar, a non-profit organization whose mission is to promote youth professional, social and personal development by teaching them means of filmmaking. Over 2000 youth have enrolled in its educational program since it was established in 2004. He is also member of the civic movements Agora! and RenovaBR.
There were talks that Huck would run for president in the 2018 Brazilian general election. The presenter declined the offer but said he would keep "discussing important issues for Brazil".

Personal life 
Luciano Huck is married to the Brazilian television presenter, actress and singer Angélica Ksyvickis. They are parents of Joaquim, (born on March 8, 2005) Benício, (born on November 3, 2007) and Eva (born on September 25, 2012).

Filmography

Television

Film

Awards 
Huck received the Prêmio Extra de Televisão award for Best TV Host for 8 consecutive years (2013, 2012, 2011, 2010, 2009, 2008, 2007 and 2006), an accolade organized by Rio de Janeiro newspaper Extra, and it is similar to the People's Choice Awards.

Caldeirão do Huck also received the same award as Best Variety Show for 9 years (2011, 2010, 2009, 2008, 2007, 2006, 2005, 2004 and 2003), including an Outstanding Award for the feature Soletrando (a type of spelling bee) in 2007.

References

External links 

 
 Luciano Huck's profile at Memória Globo 
 Caldeirão do Huck homepage at TV Globo

1973 births
Living people
People from São Paulo
Brazilian people of Ukrainian-Jewish descent
Brazilian television presenters
Brazilian television personalities
Brazilian Jews
University of São Paulo alumni